Rostyslav Volodymyrovych Babiychuk (14 February 1911 – 11 January 2013) was a Soviet and Ukrainian party and state official.

Biography
Rostyslav Babiychuk was born in Kishinev, Bessarabia Governorate, Russian Empire (today Chișinău, Moldova) in a family of railway workers. He joined the All-Union Communist Party (Bolsheviks) (Communist Party of the Soviet Union) in 1939 and headed department of propaganda and agitation at the Odessa Railways Khrystynivka department, while being an instructor at the Communist Party (Bolsheviks) of Ukraine.

During the World War II he worked at the Northern Railway in Ivanovo.

In 1951–1952 Babiychuk was the First Secretary of Zhytomyr Oblast committee of the Communist Party (Bolsheviks) of Ukraine. In 1954–1976 he was a candidate member of the Central Committee of the Communist Party of Ukraine. In 1956–1971 Babiychuk was a Minister of Culture of Ukraine.

References

External links
 Бабийчук Ростислав Владимирович. www.knowbysight.info
 Міністри культури України привітають міністра культури УРСР із 100-річчям. Istorychna Pravda (Ukrayinska Pravda). 14 February 2011.

1911 births
2013 deaths
Politicians from Chișinău
People from Kishinyovsky Uyezd
Ukrainian people in the Russian Empire
Central Committee of the Communist Party of Ukraine (Soviet Union) members
First secretaries in non-national subdivisions of the Soviet Union
Culture ministers of Ukraine
Fourth convocation members of the Verkhovna Rada of the Ukrainian Soviet Socialist Republic
Fifth convocation members of the Verkhovna Rada of the Ukrainian Soviet Socialist Republic
Seventh convocation members of the Verkhovna Rada of the Ukrainian Soviet Socialist Republic
Eighth convocation members of the Verkhovna Rada of the Ukrainian Soviet Socialist Republic
Recipients of the Order of the Red Banner of Labour
Recipients of the Order of Merit (Ukraine), 3rd class
Recipients of the Order of Prince Yaroslav the Wise, 4th class
Recipients of the Order of Prince Yaroslav the Wise, 5th class
Ukrainian centenarians
Men centenarians